Harry Davis may refer to:

Sports
 Harry Davis (1900s first baseman) (1873–1947), Major League Baseball first baseman
 Harry Davis (1930s first baseman) (1908–1997), played for the Detroit Tigers and St. Louis Browns (1932–1937)
 Harry Davis (Australian footballer) (1879–1948), Australian rules footballer
 Harry Davis (basketball) (born 1956), American professional basketball player
 Harry Davis (footballer, born 1873) (1873–1938), English footballer for Sheffield Wednesday 
 Harry Davis (footballer, born 1879) (1879–1945), English footballer for Barnsley, Sheffield Wednesday
 Harry Davis (footballer, born 1991), English association football player

Others
 Harry Davis (soldier) (1841–1929), American Civil War soldier and Medal of Honor recipient
 Harry Davis (potter) (1910–1986), English potter
 Harry Edward Davis, state legislator and community leader in Cleveland, Ohio
 Harry L. Davis (1878–1950), 50th Governor of Ohio
 Harry Davis (gangster) (1898–1946), Montreal gangster
 W. Harry Davis (1923–2006), American civil rights activist, boxing coach and businessman
 Birthname of the actor Tyrell Davis (1902–1970)

See also
 Henry Davis (disambiguation)
 Harold Davis (disambiguation)
 Harry Davies (disambiguation)